William Roland Stine (September 7, 1940 – April 24, 2003) was an American politician and educator.

Born in Shelbyville, Indiana, Stine received his bachelor's and master's degrees from Indiana University. He taught history at Shelbyville Central Middle School. He served on the Shelbyville City Council from 1987 to 2002. He then served in the Indiana House of Representatives in 2003 as a Republican. 
Stine was killed in an automobile accident in Johnson County, Indiana, while serving his first year in the Indiana General Assembly. He was struck by a drunk driver who also happened to be a former student of his.

Notes

1940 births
2003 deaths
People from Shelbyville, Indiana
Indiana University alumni
Indiana city council members
Republican Party members of the Indiana House of Representatives
Road incident deaths in Indiana
20th-century American politicians